Wesley Sulzberger (born 20 October 1986) is an Australian former professional cyclist, who rode professionally between 2009 and 2016.

Career
Born in Launceston, Tasmania, Sulzberger started cycling with the West Tamar Cycling Club. He began his career with the Australian Continental Team Southaustralia.com–AIS and later joined . After three years with the team, Sulzberger moved to the  team for the 2012 season. He remained with the team until the end of the 2013 season, when he joined  for the 2014 season; he joined his brother Bernard Sulzberger, on the squad.

Major results

2006
 1st Overall Tour of Gippsland
1st Stage 7
 Tour of Tasmania
1st Stages 6, 10 & 11
 1st Stage 1 Tour de Hokkaido
2007
 1st  Road race, National Under-23 Road Championships
 1st Stage 2 Herald Sun Tour
 2nd  Road race, UCI Under-23 Road World Championships
2008
 1st Stage 2 Tour of Japan
2009
 1st Stage 2 Paris–Corrèze
 5th Overall Tour Down Under
2010
 1st Grand Prix de Plumelec-Morbihan
2011
 8th Overall Tour of Turkey
 8th Overall Bayern Rundfahrt
2013
 4th Prueba Villafranca de Ordizia
2014
 10th Overall Tour de Taiwan
2016
 1st Stage 3 Le Tour de Filipinas
 1st Mountains classification Tour de Kumano

Grand Tour general classification results timeline

References

External links

Wesley Sulzberger profile
Wesley Sulzberger wins in Japan
FRANÇAISE DES JEUX

1986 births
Living people
Australian male cyclists
Cyclists from Tasmania
Sportspeople from Launceston, Tasmania